The 1905 Saskatchewan general election was the first provincial election in the newly created Canadian province of Saskatchewan. It was held on 13 December 1905 to elect members of the Legislative Assembly of Saskatchewan.  Walter Scott led the Liberal Party of Saskatchewan to victory over the Provincial Rights Party of Frederick W. A. G. Haultain, and became the first Premier of the new province.

Members of the Legislative Assembly elected
For complete electoral history, see individual districts

Note:
*In 1907 by order of the Legislative Assembly Samuel Donaldson of the Provincial Rights party was declared elected and Peter Tyerman lost his seat.

See also
List of Saskatchewan political parties

References
Saskatchewan Archives Board – Election Results By Electoral Division
Elections Saskatchewan - Provincial Vote Summaries

Further reading
 

1905 elections in Canada
1905 in Saskatchewan
1905
December 1905 events